Lauren Gauci (born 8 April 1996) is an Australian rules footballer. She was selected by the West Coast Eagles as an undrafted free agent following the 2020 AFL Women's draft, and made her AFL Women's debut in round 4 of the 2021 AFL Women's season.

Career
Before playing for West Coast, she played for North Adelaide in the SANFLW, including playing in the team's 2020 SANFLW premiership.

She nominated for the 2020 AFL Women's draft, and was selected by the West Coast Eagles as an undrafted free agent. Players that are not drafted from their nominated state by the end of the draft can be approached and signed by clubs outside of their state as undrafted free agents, as long as those clubs have room on their team.

Gauci missed the first three matches of the 2021 season due to a knee injury. She made her AFL Women's debut in round 4 of that season, on 21 February, playing against  at Blacktown ISP Oval. Gauci was one of three former North Adelaide players making their debut in 2021 for West Coast. She continued through the season to play all five of the remaining matches.

In May 2022, Gauci was delisted by West Coast.

References

1996 births
Living people
West Coast Eagles (AFLW) players
North Adelaide Football Club players